Bader Al-Nashi was the secretary general of Hadas, The Islamic Constitutional Movement in Kuwait from 2003 until 2009.

References

Year of birth missing (living people)
Living people
Kuwaiti Muslim Brotherhood members
Hadas politicians